The following table displays the ranks of the Community Cadet Forces (Army Cadet Force, the Sea Cadet Corps, and the Air Training Corps), the Combined Cadet Force, the Volunteer Cadet Corps (RMVCC and RNVCC), and the Girls Venture Corps Air Cadets. This table is based on equivalent Rank Structures within the Cadet Forces as detailed in regulations of the SCC, RMC, and the Air Cadets.

Cadet ranks 
Cadet NCOs wear the issued cadet rank slides. The titles of some ranks in the ACF and CCF Army may vary as cadet detachments are affiliated to British Army regiments and adopt their terminology. More senior cadet ranks may be restricted to a set number per area. 

Although promotion is based on merit rather than progression through the training syllabuses, certain criteria must be met before a cadet is eligible for promotion: 

Whilst the CCF Regulations provide an equivalency table purely for the CCF, there is no official equivalency between the other cadet forces.

Junior cadets

Former cadet organisations

Welbeck DSFC 

Epaulettes were worn by students whilst in the college kit, G-Kit, MTP and service uniform. It denoted their academic year and the seniority/position of authority that they held within the college. The college closed in July 2021.

CFAV Ranks

NCOs/Senior ratings 
From 2009 to 2019, if a person joined as a civilian instructor in the Sea Cadets or Royal Marine Cadets and wanted to be a uniformed member of staff, they would become an acting petty officer or sergeant, following a six-month probationary period. 

In 2018 the role of sergeant instructor (SI) was introduced for CCF(Army) sections, this is the first occasion that adults other than SSIs have been appointed as an NCO rather than a commissioned rank in the CCF.

Officers 
Formerly, officers in MOD-recognised cadet organisations (SCC, CCF, ACF, VCC) held a highest substantive rank of lieutenant, with more senior ranks being acting ranks. 

Since 2017, all cadet officers are now commissioned under a bespoke Cadet Forces Commission (CFC), with all appointments now being substantive. All previous Royal Air Force Volunteer Reserve (Training Branch) (RAFVR(T)) officers of the ATC and CCF RAF had their commissions transferred to the new CFC in 2017.

See also

Cadet Forces 
 Combined Cadet Force
 Community Cadet Forces
 Air Training Corps
 Army Cadet Force
 Sea Cadet Corps
 Royal Marines Cadets
 Volunteer Cadet Corps
 Royal Marines Volunteer Cadet Corps

International cadet ranks 
 Ranks of the Junior Reserve Officers' Training Corps
 Cadet grades and insignia of the Civil Air Patrol
 Cadets Canada Elemental Ranks
 New Zealand Cadet Forces ranks
 Australian Defence Force Cadets ranks
 Royal Belgian Sea Cadet Corps ranks

Ranks of the British Armed Forces 
 Royal Navy ratings rank insignia
 Royal Navy officer rank insignia
 British Army other ranks rank insignia
 British Army officer rank insignia
 RAF other ranks
 RAF officer ranks

Notes

References 

cadets